The Democracy in Europe Movement 2025, or DiEM25, is a pan-European political movement founded in 2016 by a group of Europeans, including former Greek Finance Minister Yanis Varoufakis and Croatian philosopher Srećko Horvat. The movement was officially launched at ceremonial events on 9 February 2016 in the Volksbühne theatre in Berlin and on 23 March in Rome.

DiEM25's tendencies are alter-globalisation, social ecology, ecofeminism, post-growth and post-capitalism. Implementation of a universal basic income is widely defended among its members.

The acronym DiEM alludes to the Latin phrase carpe diem. To highlight the urgency of democratising Europe before reaching a point of no return, the movement sets the horizon for the year 2025 to draft a democratic constitution that will replace all the European treaties that are in force today. One year after its foundation, DiEM25 declared that it had over 60,000 members from across the European Union.

Aims
DiEM25 argues that the people of Europe need to seize the opportunity to create political organisations at a pan-European level. Its participants consider that the model of national parties forming fragile alliances in the European Parliament is obsolete and that a pan-European movement is necessary to confront the great economic, political and social crises in Europe today. In its analysis, the movement considers that these crises threaten to disintegrate Europe, and which possess characteristics that are similar to those of the Great Depression of the 1930s.

DiEM25 seeks to create a more democratic Europe. They see the European Union becoming a technocratic superstate ruled by edict. DiEM25 aims instead to make Europe a union of people governed by democratic consent through a policy of decentralisation. DiEM25 cites eight distinct elements of European governance by compulsion, the first of which is "hit-squad inspectorates and the Troika they formed together with unelected 'technocrats' from other international and European institutions". Adding that the establishment is "contemptuous of democracy" and "all political authority [must come] from Europe’s sovereign peoples".

DiEM25 would like to act as an umbrella organization, gathering left-wing parties, grassroots protest movements and "rebel regions" to develop a common response to the five crises Europe faces today, namely debt, banking, poverty, low investment and migration. Further, DiEM25 wishes to reform EU institutions, originally designed to serve industry, so that they become fully transparent and responsive to European citizens. Ultimately, DiEM25 envisions European citizens writing a democratic constitution for the European Union.

Adopting a bottom-up approach by mobilising at a grassroots level, the movement aims to reform the European Union's existing institutions to create a "full-fledged democracy with a sovereign Parliament respecting national self-determination and sharing power with national Parliaments, regional assemblies and municipal councils" in order to replace the "Brussels bureaucracy". Among others, the movement is supported by prominent American linguist and political activist Noam Chomsky, Italian philosopher Antonio Negri, American anthropologist Charles Nuckolls, American economist James K. Galbraith and former Labour MP Stuart Holland. Diverse figures including Julian Assange, film director Ken Loach, Green Party MP Caroline Lucas, British Labour politician John McDonnell, Dutch sociologist Saskia Sassen, Franco Berardi and Slovenian philosopher Slavoj Žižek are on its Advisory Panel.

DiEM25 supports the petition "Transparency in Europe now!", requesting the live broadcasting of the meetings of major European institutions, a comprehensive list of all Brussels lobbyists and the electronic publication of all TTIP negotiating documents. DiEM25 describes itself as internationalist and promotes a foreign policy where non-Europeans are "ends-in-themselves".

Policies
The democratisation of Europe is the motivating force behind DiEM25.The overwhelming consensus within the movement is that the EU will either be democratised, or it will disintegrate.
Ultimately the goal is to achieve a Europe of reason, liberty, tolerance, and imagination, all of which will be made possible by comprehensive transparency, real solidarity and authentic democracy. DiEM25's priorities are:

 Full transparency in decision-making (e.g. live streaming of European Council, ECOFIN and Eurogroup meetings, full disclosure of trade negotiation documents, publication of ECB minutes) and 
 The urgent redeployment of existing EU institutions in the pursuit of innovative policies that genuinely address the crises of debt, banking, inadequate investment, rising poverty and migration.

European New Deal
DiEM25's European New Deal addresses the following issues:
 Taming finance by regulating banking and establishing a new public digital payments platform that ends the monopoly of banks over Europe's payments.
 Ending precarity through an Anti-Poverty Program, a Social-Housing Program and a job guarantee Program.
 Fixing the Euro and saving the Eurozone requires the abolition of self-defeating austerity and minimising the cost of its disintegration where it has occurred.
 Pan-European coordination between Eurozone and non-Eurozone countries to maximise Europe's recovery, optimise the economic and social outcomes across Europe, and address the major environmental and socioeconomic factors causing involuntary mass migration.
 Green investment linking central banking operations with public investment programs and the new public digital payments platforms.
 A Universal Basic Dividend which can democratise the economic sphere and construct a pathway towards a post-capitalist economy.

Green New Deal for Europe
The Green New Deal for Europe is a policy platform, drawing on the knowledge and experiences of researchers, activists, practitioners, and communities around Europe. The coalition's landmark policy report, the Blueprint for Europe’s Just Transition, maps out the policies and strategies needed to make the just transition a reality across Europe.

The proposals it sets out fall into four themes:
 Pathways to the Green New Deal for Europe explores the grassroots organizing and mobilizing strategies that can help advance the agenda for a just transition.
 The Green Public Works is an investment plan to power Europe's green transition and simultaneously build a just, equal and democratic economy.
 The Environmental Union is a new regulatory framework for the just transition, aligning Europe's laws with the scientific consensus and legislates for sustainability and solidarity.
 The Environmental Justice Commission is an independent body who will research, monitor, and advise EU policymakers to advance the cause of environmental justice across Europe and around the world.

Agenda

The movement proposes a Progressive Agenda for Europe for which DiEM25 is developing common whitepapers centred around eight pillars. Each whitepaper is created with input from all of DiEM25's members as well as a range of experts in the respective fields.
 Transparency: Introducing transparent government across Europe, to expose and end the opaqueness of European institutions’ meetings and summits, while also ensuring that all relevant documents and protocols of trade negotiations are made public. In March 2016, only a month after the movement's launch, the  Transparency in Europe Now! campaign was set up and demanded that all EU decision-making take place under the scrutiny of its citizens’.
 Refugees and Migration: DiEM25 calls upon Europeans and their elected representatives to overrule the EU-Turkey Agreement, and thus end the EU's practice of “sacrificing human lives and basic humanist principles on the altar of appeasing xenophobes and ultra-nationalists”. The primary target of this campaign is the controversial EU-Turkey Agreement, which came into effect on 20 March 2016. This agreement was the latest in a long line of developments in EU-Turkey relations. Involuntary migration is a huge crisis facing Europe. With no jobs or prospects at home, Europeans move because they must. DiEM25's view is that walls and fences are not the solution and that only shared investment can end the crisis of precarity.
 The European New Deal: Rationalising Europe's economy in line with the initiatives outlined under DiEM25's Policies as outlined above. Europe is plagued by chronic crises: debts, banks, poverty, investment, and involuntary migration. DiEM25 aims to unite progressive forces across Europe to develop solutions to these crises and subsequently mobilise to make them a reality. For years the EU establishment has pretended that the crises was over, congratulating themselves on fixing the problems they created in the first place. But the crises have not only not gone away, but have instead deepened.
 Labour: Issues around labour, technology, employment and the distribution of income, moving beyond the capital-labour contract, and basic income.
 Ecological Transition: Imagining a post-capitalist economic and social model, as outlined above, in the section on The Green New Deal for Europe.
 A European Constitution: Imagining a democratic pan-European constitution and the how that could be achieved. 
 Technological Sovereignty: DiEM25 believes that technological progress can go hand in hand with political and social progress – by putting human flourishing at the centre of all technological change. For this reason, the main objectives are the establishment of a Digital Commonwealth in Europe to counteract the power of platform monopolies, as well as the Democratisation of Innovation. Technology monopolies have gained a tremendous power to shape perceptions on knowledge and information, while simultaneously avoiding any democratic accountability of that power. Since technology has become a central tenet of power in today's society,  any power must ultimately belong to the sovereign citizens of a technologized society. The Tech Pillar promotes an ambitious plan to achieve Technological Sovereignty, which is seen as the right of citizens, while giving agency to democratic institutions to make self-determined choices regarding technology and technological innovation.
 Vision for Culture: From its beginning, DiEM25 has placed arts and culture at the heart of its vision of a democratic Europe. The on-going crisis in Europe is not only economic, nor only political. We are also in the throes of a severe crisis of culture: ‘the disintegration, destruction or suspension of some basic elements of sociocultural life.’ The Movement's mission is dedicated to developing a new vision for culture in Europe and providing a platform for its expression; all in a way that connects rather than divides people.

Brexit
DiEM25 seeks to avert European fracture. They cite emerging extremist nationalism and Brexit and Grexit as splintering Europe. In the lead up to the Brexit referendum, DiEM25 co-founder Yanis Varoufakis worked with British Labour Party leader Jeremy Corbyn to support Great Britain's stay in the European Union. Varoufakis cited the special concessions granted by the European Union to the United Kingdom in February 2016 as evidence of European disintegration. After the Leave victory in the Brexit referendum DiEM25 members decided to support the triggering of article 50 on the condition that the UK would exit the EU under a Norway+ agreement, preserving freedom of movement and access to the single market. In light of the UK government's refusal to negotiate such an agreement, in October 2018 DiEM25 members voted to launch a campaign, "Take a Break from Brexit", calling for an extension of the negotiations period, under article 50 provisions. However, in defiance of the official stance of the movement, Varoufakis publicly opposed the extension and in May 2020, a few months after the defeat of Jeremy Corbyn, declared his support for a no deal Brexit at the end of the transition phase.

Structure 
DiEM25 has four constituent parts, namely a Coordinating Collective (CC), a Validation Council (VC), DiEM25 Spontaneous Collectives (DSCs) and an Advisory Board. To raise money, DiEM25 uses crowdfunding.

The Coordinating Collective has twelve members who meet weekly to lead DiEM25's actions. DiEM25 schedules an electronic vote every six months to permit all DiEM25 members to renew half of the CC's seats. Coordinating Collective members cannot simultaneously belong to another political party, or be ministers or parliamentarians still in office.

The Validation Council has 100 participants who monitor DiEM25 members’ good conduct, make decisions when urgency and time do not permit a membership digital referendum and validate the Coordinating Collective's proposals. Any DiEM25 member can apply to join the VC; DiEM25 selects Validation Council seats by drawing lots. Like the Coordinating Collective vote, DiEM25 schedules a selection for half of the VC's seats every six months.

DiEM25 Spontaneous Collectives self-organize to forward DiEM's goals. DSCs form based on affinity and municipal, regional or national location, meeting face-to-face or online.

The Advisory Board advises DiEM25. The Coordinating Collective and the Validation Council jointly elect advisors based on their recognized achievements and expertise in their fields (artistic, political and academic, among others).

Electoral politics

Electoral wings (political parties as part of the movement) 
DiEM25 has electoral wings, which are parties that are a tool of the movement to get involved in electoral politics and bring its program to the ballot box. Currently there are the following established electoral wings:

European Parliament election in 2019 
From its foundation, DiEM25 gathered affiliations from national political parties that agree with the DiEM25 agenda and in May 2017 began discussing running such a party in the 2019 European Parliament election. From this alliance, DiEM25 established during 2018 an electoral list for the 2019 European Parliament elections named European Spring which by 2019 was styling itself a transnational European political party list. On 25 November 2018, Varoufakis was chosen as a Spitzenkandidat for DiEM25 in the 2019 European Parliament elections. He has decided to be on the candidates list of Democracy in Europe in Germany later and was elected with a great majority. Affiliated parties were the following:

Development, criticism and reception 
The launch of the initiative was widely covered by the international press. The leading European media reflected in their reports the following days both the potential of the movement and the major contradictions it faces. Varoufakis was asked by the press about the relationship between his initiative and the proposals of other leaders of the European left to confront and to handle what they see as a "crisis of neoliberalism", including the proposals of Oskar Lafontaine in Germany and Jean-Luc Mélenchon in France, for a recovery of sovereignty and a return to national currencies, abandoning the euro. On this point, which is contentious due to the confrontation of opposing positions within the European left, Varoufakis rejected a return of sovereignty to nation-states. He argued for the main goal of the movement to be the repoliticisation of Europe as a unit and the democratisation of its institutions as a way of dealing with tendencies of separation, fragmentation, competition and isolation.

Varoufakis was harshly criticized by conservatives for his initiative, notably German conservatives. In an article entitled "Varoufakis' kleine Internationale gegen Kapitalismus" ("Varoufakis' little International against capitalism"), the conservative German newspaper Die Welt suggested that Varoufakis' proposals "would shatter Europe apart rather than cure it". In its note on the launching of DiEM25, the paper suggests that this initiative was a product of Varoufakis being "embittered" by the rejection of his ideas. According to the article, Varoufakis could not have been able to accept that his colleagues had not wanted to follow him and would have concluded that he needed international alliances since he had not been able to impose himself at the national level.

Prominent members or former members 

 Yanis Varoufakis (Greece)
 Rui Tavares (Portugal)
 Srećko Horvat (Croatia)
 Lorenzo Marsili (Italy)
 Noam Chomsky (United States)
 Ada Colau (Spain)
 Brian Eno (United Kingdom)
Julien Bayou (France)
 Jean-Michel Jarre (France)
 James K. Galbraith (United States)
 Susan George (United States/France)
 Boris Groys (Germany)
 Ken Loach (United Kingdom)
Antonio Negri (Italy)
 Baltasar Garzón (Spain)
 Saskia Sassen (United States/Netherlands)
 Mikuláš Peksa (Czech Republic)
 Slavoj Žižek (Slovenia)
 Agnieszka Dziemianowicz-Bąk (Poland)
 Federico Mayor Zaragoza (Spain)
 Aleksandar Novaković (Serbia)
 Pamela Anderson (Canada/United States)
 Gaspar Llamazares (Spain)
 John McDonnell (United Kingdom)
 Michal Gabriš (Slovakia)
 Dušan Pajović (Montenegro)

See also 
 New Deal (France)

References

External links

"Yanis Varoufakis' TED Talk: Capitalism will eat democracy – unless we speak up"

Ecofeminism
Economy of the European Union
Environmentalism in Europe
Eurozone
Eurozone crisis
Left-wing politics in Europe
Liberalism in Europe
Organizations related to the European Union
Pan-European political parties
Political movements in Europe
Political parties supporting universal basic income
Pro-Europeanism
Progressive International
Progressivism
Separatism in Europe
Socialism in Europe